Ivo Štakula (February 25, 1923 – October 26, 1958) was a Croatian water polo player who represented Croatia and Yugoslavia nationally and was a long-time player for VK Jug Dubrovnik.

He died in Melbourne.

Štakula played with the Yugoslavian national team from 
1946 to 1956. He participated in the 1948, 1952 and 1956 Olympics. He defected to Australia after the 1956 Summer Olympics in Melbourne.

Štakula won silver with the team at the 1952 Olympics. Four years later he was a squad member of the Yugoslav Olympic team in the 1956 tournament but did not play in a match.

He also played for the Croatian national water polo team during World War II.

See also
 List of Olympic medalists in water polo (men)

References

External links
 

1923 births
1958 deaths
Croatian male water polo players
Yugoslav male water polo players
Olympic water polo players of Yugoslavia
Water polo players at the 1948 Summer Olympics
Water polo players at the 1952 Summer Olympics
Water polo players at the 1956 Summer Olympics
Olympic silver medalists for Yugoslavia
Yugoslav defectors
Olympic medalists in water polo
Medalists at the 1952 Summer Olympics